University of the Pacific may refer to:
University of the Pacific (Colombia)
University of the Pacific (Ecuador)
University of the Pacific (Peru)
University of the Pacific (United States)
University of Asia Pacific, Bangladesh
University of Asia and the Pacific, a private research university in the Philippines
University of the South Pacific, an intergovernmental organization and public research university with a number of locations spread throughout a dozen countries in Oceania

See also
 Pacific University, Forest Grove, Oregon, United States
 Alaska Pacific University, Anchorage, Alaska, United States
 Azusa Pacific University, Azusa, California, United States
 Pacific University (India), Udaipur, Rajasthan, India
 Warner Pacific University, Portland, Oregon, United States